The 1975 Men's World Weightlifting Championships were held at the Luzhniki Sports Palace in Moscow, Soviet Union from September 15 to September 23, 1975. There were 169 men in action from 33 nations.

Medal summary

Medal table
Ranking by Big (Total result) medals 

Ranking by all medals: Big (Total result) and Small (Snatch and Clean & Jerk)

References
Results (Sport 123)
Weightlifting World Championships Seniors Statistics

External links
International Weightlifting Federation

World Weightlifting Championships
World Weightlifting Championships
World Weightlifting Championships
International weightlifting competitions hosted by the Soviet Union
Sports competitions in Moscow
Weightlifting in Russia